Yes Sir, That's My Baby or variants may refer to:

"Yes Sir, That's My Baby" (song), a 1925 originally English-language song by Gus Kahn and Walter Donaldson
Yes Sir, That's My Baby (film), a 1949 film
Yessir, That's My Baby (album), a 1978 Count Basie and Oscar Peterson album

See also
That's My Baby (disambiguation)